Enixotrophon sansibaricus is a species of sea snail, a marine gastropod mollusk in the family Muricidae, the murex snails or rock snails.

Description

Distribution
This marine species occurs off the Zanzibar Archipelago.

References

 Thiele J. (1925). Gastropoden der Deutschen Tiefsee-Expedition. II Teil. Wissenschaftliche Ergebnisse der Deutschen Tiefsee-Expedition auf dem Dampfer "Valdivia" 1898-1899. 17(2): 35-382, pls 13-46
 Houart R., Kilburn R.N. & Marais A.P. (2010) Muricidae. pp. 176–270, in: Marais A.P. & Seccombe A.D. (eds), Identification guide to the seashells of South Africa. Volume 1. Groenkloof: Centre for Molluscan Studies. 376 pp.

External links
 Barco, A.; Marshall, B.; A. Houart, R.; Oliverio, M. (2015). Molecular phylogenetics of Haustrinae and Pagodulinae (Neogastropoda: Muricidae) with a focus on New Zealand species. Journal of Molluscan Studies. 81(4): 476-488

Gastropods described in 1925
Enixotrophon